Marco Antonio Barrera Tapia (born January 17, 1974) is a Mexican former professional boxer who competed from 1989 to 2011. He held multiple world championships in three weight classes between 1995 and 2007, from super bantamweight to super featherweight.

Barrera is well known for his trilogy with fellow Mexican legend Erik Morales, his duology with Manny Pacquiao, and his rivalries with Naseem Hamed and Juan Manuel Márquez. BoxRec currently Morales 89th in its list of the greatest boxers of all time, pound for pound, while ESPN ranked Barrera as 43rd on their list of the 50 greatest boxers of all time. He was inducted into the International Boxing Hall of Fame in 2017.

Amateur career
As an amateur, Barrera had a record of 104–4 and was a five-time Mexican national champion.
Before losing his first amateur contest, Barrera had an undefeated record of 56–0.

Professional career

Super flyweight
Barrera made his professional debut at 15 when he defeated David Felix by a knockout in round two on November 22, 1989. The victory  marked the beginning of a 43 fight win streak.

In 1990, Barrera had seven fights, including his first rise in quality opposition, when he defeated veteran Iván Salazar, by a decision in eight rounds. In 1991, he had seven more fights, defeating boxers Abel Hinojosa, Javier Díaz and others.

Barrera began 1992 by winning his first professional title, defeating Justino Suárez by a decision in twelve rounds to win the Mexican super flyweight championship. He retained the title three times before the end of the year which helped improved his ranking in the super flyweight division. He defeated Abner Barajas by a decision in ten rounds, and Angel Rosario by a knockout in six rounds.

In 1993, Barrera had six bouts, winning each. He defeated Salazar in a rematch and retained his title against Noe Santillana and among others.

By 1994, Barrera was attending University to become a lawyer and also continued his boxing career. On April 13, he defeated future champion Carlos Salazar by a ten-round decision in Argentina. He also defeated former world champion Eddie Cook before the end of the year.

Super bantamweight

First world title
Barrera began 1995 by fighting for a world title. On March 31, he became the WBO super bantamweight champion by defeating Puerto Rican boxer Daniel Cobrita Jiménez by a decision in twelve rounds at Anaheim, California. By this time, many boxing journalist were calling Barrera "Mexico's next Julio César Chávez."

He made four defenses before the year was over. On June 2, 1995, he defeated future champion Frank Toledo via second round knock out. Barrera knocked Toledo down twice before the fight was stopped.

On July 15, 1995, Barrera scored a first-round knockout win over Maui Díaz (27–1). In his next bout, he won a twelve-round unanimous decision over future champion Agapito Sánchez.

On February 6, 1996, he fought on the first installment of HBO Boxing's spin-off series "HBO Boxing After Dark." In one of the fights of the year, Barrera stopped Kennedy McKinney in 12 rounds, knocking him down five times whilst suffering one knockdown himself.

After the McKinney fight, he defeated former WBO champion Jesse Benavides by third-round knockout. On July 14, 1996, he defeated another former champion, Orlando Fernandez, by seventh-round TKO.

Defeat by Junior Jones
On November 22, 1996, he suffered his first career loss and lost his title to American boxer Junior Jones, by a disqualification in round five. Barrera was knocked down in Round 5 by Jones, and was declared the loser by disqualification and not by knockout because Barrera's cornerman climbed onto the ring to stop the fight as Jones was finishing Barrera.

On April 18, 1997, he was given a chance to regain his title, facing Jones in a rematch in Las Vegas. Barrera was defeated by a unanimous decision that fans thought was controversial, but retired from boxing nonetheless regardless of the opinions of his die-hard fans.

Comeback trail 
Barrera announced a comeback in 1998, a year later, and he started off by defeating Angel Rosario by a knockout in round five. After two more wins, he was given another opportunity to fight for a world title by the WBO. On October 31, he became a two-time world super bantamweight champion by defeating Richie Wenton by a knockout in three rounds, winning the WBO's vacant title.

In 1999, he had two title defenses and then he ran into controversy. On December 18, he defeated César Najera in four rounds at California. But upon finding out that Najera had a losing record and was part of Barrera's team, the California State Athletic Commission decided to rule the fight a no contest bout.

Barrera vs. Morales I

In February 2000, Barrera was defeated by the WBC super bantamweight title holder Erik Morales by a controversial 12 round split decision. It was an intense battle in which both fighters were cut and battered. The Ring named it the fight of the year.

After the bout, the WBO reinstated Barrera as their champion and he defended the title three additional times. On June 17, 2000, he defeated Luiz Freitas (19–1–0) by first-round knockout. In his next bout, he defeated José Luis Valbuena (18–1–1) by twelve round unanimous decision. On December 1, 2000, he scored a sixth-round knockout over former world champion Jesús Salud.

Featherweight

Barrera vs. Hamed 

In 2001, Barrera moved up in weight division. On April 7, he handed British boxer Naseem Hamed his first and only loss for the lineal featherweight championship by a twelve-round decision. Before the fight, Hamed was a 3 to 1 betting favorite in Las Vegas. Hamed could not hit Barrera with his trademark lefts as Barrera circled to his left and worked both head and body. Barrera was not a fan of Hamed's antics and responded to Hamed's punches during clinches. On one occasion early in the fight, Hamed grabbed Barrera and they both fell to the ground where Barrera threw a right jab, leading to a warning from referee Joe Cortez. In the 12th and final round Barrera trapped Hamed in a full nelson and forced his head into the turnbuckle, resulting in a point deducted by referee Joe Cortez. Ultimately, Barrera threw more, harder punches and more impressive combinations than Hamed throughout the course of the fight. Barrera was awarded the victory via a unanimous decision, with the scorecards reading 115–112, 115–112, 116–111 and won the lineal and IBO featherweight titles. On September 8, 2001, he defeated former champion Enrique Sánchez by sixth-round TKO.

Barrera vs. Morales II 
On June 22, 2002, Barrera defeated Morales in a rematch via a unanimous decision, successfully defending his lineal title and winning the vacant Ring magazine title but declined Morales' the WBC belt. On November 2, he defeated former five-time world champion Johnny Tapia by a 12-round unanimous decision. Barrera then competed in his 60th career fight on 12 April 2003, defeating former WBC title holder Kevin Kelley by knockout in round four.

Barrera vs. Pacquiao I 

On November 16, 2003, Barrera was defeated by Filipino boxer Manny Pacquiao in the eleventh round when Barerra's corner threw in the towel, earning Pacquiao his third world championship in third weight division (Barrera was the recognized lineal champion and his Ring Magazine title was also on the line when he fought Pacquiao).

On June 19, 2004, Barrera defeated former WBA bantamweight title holder Paulie Ayala in Los Angeles by a tenth-round knockout.

Super featherweight

Barrera vs. Morales III
On November 27, 2004, Barrera fought Morales for the third time and became a three-division world champion by defeating Morales in a majority decision to capture the WBC super featherweight title.

On April 9, 2005, Barrera retained the title with a second-round knockout against future champion Mzonke Fana in El Paso, Texas, this win also marked Barrera's 60th career win.

On September 17 of the same year, he unified his WBC super featherweight title with the IBF title by defeating the IBF title holder Robbie Peden by a twelve-round unanimous decision in Las Vegas.

Barrera vs. Juárez 
On May 20, 2006, Barrera defended his title against American boxer Rocky Juárez with what was announced immediately after the fight as a twelve-round draw, which the judges scored 115–113, 113–115 and 114–114. However, tabulation errors were found in the judges' scorecards, leading to a final score of 115–114, 114–115 and 115–114, a split decision in favor of Barerra. He fought Juárez in a rematch bout on September 16, this time Barrera won by a unanimous decision with scores of (117–111, 115–113, 115–113).

Barrera vs. Márquez 
On March 17, 2007, Barrera lost his WBC super featherweight title to fellow Mexican boxer Juan Manuel Márquez by unanimous, but controversial decision. Even without counting the clear knockdown of Marquez, HBO had the fight in favor of Barrera. Understandably, Barrera claimed that the judges and referee were wrong, because he knocked down Márquez in the seventh round and the referee ruled it a slip.

Barrera vs. Pacquiao II 

Barrera fought Pacquiao in a rematch bout for the WBC International super featherweight title on October 6, 2007, in Las Vegas. Barrera was defeated by a unanimous decision with scores of 118–109, 118–109, 115–112. After the match, Barrera expressed his desire to retire from boxing, however no official confirmation had been given. On February 13, 2008, Barrera announced to the media that he would fight the winner of the Márquez vs. Pacquiao bout on March 15. The winner of this turned out to be Pacquiao, in a split decision. However, Pacquiao's move to the lightweight division and subsequent capture of the WBC lightweight title ensured that a third fight between the two would not happen.

Lightweight 
Marco Antonio Barrera, at 35, ended his brief retirement and signed a five-year contract on August 26, 2008, with promoter Don King. He moved up to the lightweight division, his goal to become the first Mexican ever to win a title in 4 different weight divisions.

On November 7, 2008, Barrera marked his return to the ring, in Chengdu, China, by knocking out Sammy Ventura in his first bout in the lightweight division.

Barrera vs. Khan 
It was announced on January 15, 2009, that Barrera would return to the ring against British boxer Amir Khan. Even with Barrera getting on in years, this was seen to be the biggest test of the young Briton's career thus far. Frank Warren promoted the fight, which took place on March 14, 2009, at the MEN Arena.

Barrera lost the bout by a fifth-round technical decision. In the first round, the two fighters clashed heads, resulting in a deep gash above Barrera's forehead, which bled throughout the bout. Ringside doctors stopped the fight at the beginning of the fifth round due to the severity of the cut. The judges scored the fight 50–45, 50–45 and 50–44 for Khan at the point of stoppage and he was declared the winner by technical decision. However, there was some controversy over the time of the stoppage, as Barrera had sustained the cut during the first round and that it would be constantly examined before the referee officially stopped the fight in the fifth round.

On March 26, 2009, as a result of the controversial stoppage timing, Barrera's promoter, Don King, filed a protest with the British Boxing Board of Control, WBA and WBO on behalf of Barrera, claiming the accidental clash of heads should have resulted in the fight being ruled a no-contest. Under the rules governing the bout, had the fight been stopped prior to the end of the fourth round due to the accidental headbutt, the official ruling would have been no contest, requiring an immediate rematch. Referee Dave Parris, however, waited until midway through the fourth round before asking the ringside physician to inspect the wound.

Before this fight, Barrera had fought Freudis Rojas on January 31, 2009, in Zapopan, Jalisco. Rojas was disqualified for a headbutt which left Barrera with a bad cut over his left eye. The cut could have jeopardized Barrera's scheduled bout against Khan. Despite this injury, he recovered in time for his bout with Khan and the fight went ahead regardless.

Comeback 
After the loss, Barrera took a period of inactivity. The former three time world champion fought on June 26, 2010, against Adailton de Jesus of Brazil. The 10 round bout took place at the Alamodome, San Antonio, Texas, United States. The match was an undercard of the Latin Fury 15 event, which featured Julio César Chávez Jr. vs. John Duddy. Barrera dominated De Jesus for 10 rounds, winning via decision. On February 12, 2011, he fought Jose Arias of the Dominican Republic and scored a TKO in the second round; this was to be Barrera's final fight.

Outside boxing
Barrera's fights were promoted by Oscar De La Hoya under the organization of Golden Boy Promotions. He trained at De La Hoya's training facility in Big Bear, California.

Since January 2009, Barrera has been a commentator for ESPN Deportes' weekly boxing show Golpe a Golpe ("Blow by Blow") which airs live on Friday nights on the network. Barrera's co-host is SportsCenter anchor Jorge Eduardo Sanchez. Golpe a Golpe is the lead-in show to ESPN Deportes' popular Viernes de Combates ("Friday Night Fights") boxing series and is the first ESPN Deportes show dedicated solely to boxing.

He is a natural left handed boxer who fought in a conventional orthodox stance.

Professional boxing record

Exhibition boxing record

Pay-per-view bouts

See also
List of WBC world champions
List of IBF world champions
List of WBO world champions
List of The Ring world champions

References

External links

Marco Antonio Barrera profile at About.com

1974 births
International Boxing Federation champions
International Boxing Organization champions
Living people
Boxers from Mexico City
Super-flyweight boxers
Lightweight boxers
World Boxing Council champions
World Boxing Organization champions
World featherweight boxing champions
World super-bantamweight boxing champions
World super-featherweight boxing champions
World boxing champions
Mexican male boxers
The Ring (magazine) champions
Boxing commentators
International Boxing Hall of Fame inductees